The House of Ossoliński (plural: Ossolińscy) is the name of a Polish szlachta (nobility) family. Because Polish adjectives have different forms for the genders, Ossolińska is the form for a female family member.

History

The Ossolińskis were a magnate family. They appeared in the historical annals at the beginning of the 14th century. The family originated from Ossolin in Lesser Poland. The progenitor of the family was Jan of Ossolin, son of Great Marshal of the Crown and castellan of Kraków Nawoj of Tęczyn. Jan was the main heir of the property that Nawoj left after his death. Due to the tradition in medieval Poland, he started to use the surname derived from the main family seat.
Grand Chancellor of the Crown Jerzy Ossoliński was granted a hereditary princely title by Pope Urban VIII in 1633. He also received a similar title, Reichsfürst, from the Emperor Ferdinand II in 1634. Another title was granted to Jerzy's cousin Franciszek Maksymilian Ossoliński by Louis XV, King of France, in 1736. Both titles became extinct in 1790. Józef Maksymilian Ossoliński's famous library assembled in Vienna was transferred to Lwów, where he had located the Ossoliński Institute in 1817.

Coat of arms and motto

The Ossoliński family used the "Topór" arms.

The Ossolinski's castle was reputedly the biggest in Europe prior to the building of Versailles (see James Michener's book Poland). Its name was 'Krzyżtopór' ("The Battle Axe of The Cross").

The descendants are represented in North Western England through Count Boris Ossolinski, whose Jackson heiress bride is remembered in England as Countess Mary Ossalinsky.

Members

 Jan Zbigniew Ossoliński (1555–1628), Podkomorzy, voivode
 Krzysztof Ossoliński (1587–1645) Podkomorzy, Podstoli, voivode
 Jerzy Ossoliński (1595–1650), Great Crown Chancellor
 Helena Tekla Ossolińska (?-1687), was married to Aleksander Michał Lubomirski
 Franciszek Maksymilian Ossoliński (1676–1756) Grand Chancellor
 Anna Teresa Ossolińska (?-1810), was married to Stanisław Potocki
 Józef Maksymilian Ossoliński (1748–1826), founder of the Ossoliński Institute
 Józef Kajetan Ossoliński (1758–1834), castellan, senator

Palaces

See also

 Ossolineum
 Ossolin

Bibliography
 Andrzej Przybyszewski, Ossolińscy herbu Topór, Radomyśl Wielki, 2009,

External links
 Ossolinski family web page